Kimberly-Rose Wolter is an American actress, writer, producer and co-founder of VS Theatre company in Los Angeles, California.

Film
Wolter  has written and starred in two feature films, 2003's Tre which won the Special Jury Prize at the 2007 San Francisco International Asian American Film Festival and Knots due to be released in 2011. She had a role in Eric Byler's 2002 feature Charlotte Sometimes and starred in 2010's Strangers. She played a nurse in the 2011 feature film Soul Surfer.

Theatre
Wolter co-founded VS. Theatre Company (pronounced "versus") in 2003.

The company's first production, the West Coast premiere of "The Credeaux Canvas" in which Wolter starred as 'Amelia', was widely praised earning the Los Angeles Times "Critics Choice" who said "The performances are rich, spontaneous, and often side-splittingly funny". It was followed by acclaimed productions of John Corwin's "Navy Pier" and John Patrick Shanley's "Beggars in the House of Plenty".

Production
In 2007 Wolter and VS. Theatre's co-production with The Elephant Theatre Company of "In Arabia We'd all be Kings" was named "Best Production" by the Los Angeles Drama Critic's Circle.

Wolter followed that by co-producing a 2008 staging of John Kolvenbach's "On An Average Day" which earned the Los Angeles Times "Critics Choice", Backstage West's "Critics Pick" and was described as "...searing ...a tour de force" by Variety. The success of the production led to a transfer to Chicago where Wolter's Los Angeles cast reprised their roles in a joint venture with the 'Route 66 Theatre Company'. A complimentary review in The Chicago Tribune noted the casts "...quality."

On March 19, 2011, Wolter's production of the West coast premiere of Neil LaBute's "The Mercy Seat" opened in Los Angeles. She wrote and published a short animated promotional clip to support the production.

Directing
Wolter directed a Public Service Announcement in 2010 which featured children encouraging adults to vote.

Commercials, Voiceover and Promotion
In 2007 Wolter provided a voiceover for a video in support of Proposition 121. In 2010 Wolter appeared in a Michelob Ultra commercial with Lance Armstrong and in 2011 she was featured in a Hershey's 'Smores' ad. Wolter regularly appears on-stage at E3 for Microsoft and has also worked as a spokesmodel for Palm.

External links
 VS Theatre Company — Official website

Sources 

Year of birth missing (living people)
Living people
American film actresses
American stage actresses
21st-century American women